Carter–Gilmer House is a historic home located at Charlottesville, Virginia. It was built about 1820, and is a three-story, three bay, Federal style brick townhouse dwelling. The house has been divided into apartments.

It was listed on the National Register of Historic Places in 1982.

References

External links
Carter–Gilmer House, East Jefferson Street at North Eighth Street, Charlottesville, Charlottesville, VA: 9 measured drawings and 5 data pages at Historic American Buildings Survey

Historic American Buildings Survey in Virginia
Houses on the National Register of Historic Places in Virginia
Houses completed in 1820
Federal architecture in Virginia
Houses in Charlottesville, Virginia
National Register of Historic Places in Charlottesville, Virginia